Francisco Córdova (born 14 March 1944) is a Puerto Rican basketball player. He competed in the men's tournament at the 1968 Summer Olympics.

References

External links
 

1944 births
Living people
Sportspeople from Bayamón, Puerto Rico
Puerto Rican men's basketball players
1967 FIBA World Championship players
Olympic basketball players of Puerto Rico
Basketball players at the 1968 Summer Olympics